In organic chemistry, a cyclophane is a hydrocarbon consisting of an aromatic unit (typically a benzene ring) and a chain that forms a bridge between two non-adjacent positions of the aromatic ring. More complex derivatives with multiple aromatic units and bridges forming cagelike structures are also known. Cyclophanes are well-studied examples of strained organic compounds.

[n]-Cyclophanes

Structures

Paracyclophanes adopt the boat conformation normally observed in cyclohexanes. Smaller value of n lead to greater distortions. X-ray crystallography on '[6]paracyclophane' shows that the aromatic bridgehead carbon atom makes an angle of 20.5° with the plane. The benzyl carbons deviate by another 20.2°. The carbon-to-carbon bond length alternation has increased from 0 for benzene to 39 pm.   Despite their distorted structures, cyclophanes retain their aromaticity, as determined by UV-vis spectroscopy.

Reactivity
With regards to their reactivity, cyclophanes often exhibit diene-like behavior, despite evidence for aromaticity in even the most distorted [6]-cyclophane.  This highly distorted cyclophane photochemically converts to the Dewar benzene derivative.  Heat reverses the reaction. 
With dimethyl acetylenedicarboxylate, [6]metacyclophane rapidly undergoes the Diels-Alder reaction.

A non-bonding nitrogen to arene distance of 244 pm is recorded for a pyridinophane and in the unusual superphane the two benzene rings are separated by a mere 262 pm. Other representative of this group are in-methylcyclophanes, in-ketocyclophanes and in,in-Bis(hydrosilane).

NMR properties
The proton NMR spectra of cyclophanes have been intensively examined to gain insights into the aromaticity of the benzene ring.  Also of great interest is the shielding effects of the aromatic ring on the hydrocarbon strap.  Generally the aromatic protons appear near their usual positions around 7.2 ppm, indicating that even with severe distortions, the ring retains aromaticity.  The central methylene protons in the aliphatic bridge are shielded to a position of around - 0.5 ppm.

Synthesis

[6]paracyclophane can be synthesized beginning with the Bamford-Stevens reaction to form the spiro ketone 1 in scheme 3, rearranging in a pyrolysis reaction through the carbene intermediate 4. A separate route to the Dewar form involves a Ag+-induced rearrangement reaction of the bicyclopropenyl compound 7.

Metacyclophanes are generally less strained and thus more easily prepared than paracyclophanes. Shown below is the route to a [14][14]metaparacyclophane in scheme 4 featuring a in-situ Ramberg-Bäcklund Reaction converting the sulfone 3 to the alkene 4.

Naturally occurring [n]-cyclophanes
A few cyclophanes exist in nature. One example of a metacyclophane is cavicularin.
 
Haouamine A is a paracyclophane found in a certain species of tunicate. Because of its potential application as an anticancer drug it is also available from total synthesis via an alkyne - pyrone Diels-Alder reaction in the crucial step with expulsion of carbon dioxide (scheme 5).

In this compound the deviation from planarity is 13° for the benzene ring and 17° for the bridgehead carbons. An alternative cyclophane formation strategy in scheme 6 was developed based on aromatization of the ring well after the formation of the bridge.

Two additional types of cyclophanes were discovered in nature when they were isolated from two species of cyanobacteria from the family Nostocacae.  These two classes of cyclophanes are both [7,7] paracyclophanes and were named after the species from which they were extracted: cylindrocyclophanes from Cylindrospermum lichenforme and nostocyclophanes from Nostoc linckia.

[n.n]Paracyclophanes

A well studies member of the [n.n]paracyclophane family is [2.2]paracyclophane. One method for its preparation is by a 1,6-Hofmann elimination:.

The [2.2]paracyclophane-1,9-diene has been applied in ROMP to a poly(p-phenylene vinylene) with alternating cis-alkene and trans-alkene bonds using Grubbs' second generation catalyst:

The driving force for ring-opening and polymerization is strain relief. The reaction is believed to be a living polymerization due to the lack of competing reactions.

Because the two benzene rings are in close proximity this cyclophane type also serves as guinea pig for photochemical dimerization reactions as illustrated by this example:

The product formed has an octahedrane skeleton. When the amine group is replaced by a methylene group no reaction takes place: the dimerization requires through-bond overlap between the aromatic pi electrons and the sigma electrons in the C-N bond in the reactants LUMO.

Phanes 
Generalization of cyclophanes led to the concept of phanes in the IUPAC nomenclature. Some example systematic phane names are:
 [14]metacyclophane is 1(1,3)-benzenacyclopentadecaphane
 [2.2']paracyclophane (or [2.2]paracyclophane) is 1,4(1,4)-dibenzenacyclohexaphane

In "1(1,3)-benzenacyclopentadecaphane", the "1" refers to the first position of the ring as a "superatom", the "(1,3)" describes the "meta" location, "benzena" refers to the ring, and the "pentadeca" (15) describes the chain length counting the ring as one atom.

See also
Cycloparaphenylene, cyclic all-para-linked phenyl groups.
Calixarenes

General sources
 B. H. Smith, Bridged Aromatic Compounds, Academic Press, New York, 1964.
 P. M. Keehn, S. M. Rosenfeld (eds.),Cyclophanes, Vols. 1 and 2, Academic Press,New York, 1983.
 F. Vögtle, F., G. Hohner, Top. Curr. Chem. 1978, 74, 1
 F. Vögtle, P. Neumann, Top. Curr. Chem. 1983, 113, 1; 1985, 115, 1.

References

Cyclophanes